Parangal (also known as Partagal and Palangar) is a village in Kuhsarat Rural District, in the Central District of Minudasht County, Golestan Province, Iran. At the 2006 census, its population was 677, in 180 families.

References 

Populated places in Minudasht County